The Gonzaga Bulldogs baseball team is the varsity intercollegiate baseball program of Gonzaga University, located in Spokane, Washington, United States. The NCAA Division I program has been a member of the West Coast Conference since 1996 and its home venue is Washington Trust Field and Patterson Baseball Complex, opened on Gonzaga's campus in 2007.

Mark Machtolf has been the program's head coach since 2004. Through 2013, Gonzaga has appeared in eight NCAA Tournaments. It has won four conference championship series, seven regular season conference championships, and five regular season division titles. Gonzaga was formerly an affiliate member of the Pac-10 conference for baseball and previously played in the NorPac and Big Sky conferences.

As of the start of the 2013 season, 16 former Bulldogs have played in Major League Baseball.

History

Gonzaga College was founded in September 1887, and the first recorded game of the baseball program was held shortly thereafter, in 1890.  On September 14, 1910, Dave Skeels became the first Gonzaga player to appear in the major leagues when he pitched in a game for the Detroit Tigers.  In 1912, the college was recognized by the state of Washington as a university and was renamed Gonzaga University. Although the team competed in the first half of the 20th century, comprehensive records of its play do not exist prior to the 1960 season, when the team competed as an independent school in District VII of the NCAA's University Division.

Big Sky
Gonzaga was a charter member of the Big Sky Conference, which launched in the summer of 1963 with six schools. Its first baseball season was in 1964, and the Bulldogs won the conference title in 1965. Prior to the 1967 season, the program opened Pecarovich Field, named for former Gonzaga football head coach Mike Pecarovich.

Larry Koentopp was named head coach prior to the 1970 season, and the Big Sky expanded to eight teams that summer. For baseball, the conference split into two-four team divisions for the 1971 season, and Gonzaga won all won four Northern division titles from 1971 through 1974. The Zags won the Big Sky championship series in three of those four seasons, which earned a berth in the NCAA tournament in 1971, 1973, and 1974. The 1972 team entered the Big Sky tournament on a  winning streak, but was the first team eliminated. It was the only year the Big Sky used a four-team format; the other three seasons had a best-of-three series between the division winners.

Northern Pacific
Following the 1974 season, the Big Sky discontinued sponsorship of five of its ten sports, including baseball. Along with Idaho and Boise State, the program joined the new seven-team Northern Pacific Conference (NorPac) in June 1974. The Bulldogs were second in 1975, but won four conference championships in the next six seasons to advance to the NCAA tournament in 1976, 1978, 1980, and 1981. After Idaho and Boise State dropped baseball following the 1980 season, the NorPac played a final season with five teams in 1981.

Pacific-10
The four remaining NorPac programs (Gonzaga, Eastern Washington, Portland State, and Portland) moved to the Pacific-10 Conference (Pac-10) for the 1982 season, into the Northern Division with Washington, Washington State, and Oregon State. (Oregon  dropped baseball after the 1981 season; it returned in 2009.)

Gonzaga remained an affiliate member of the Pac-10 for baseball through the 1995 season, but never finished higher than runner-up in the North. The Bulldogs appeared in the division tournament six times (1986–1991) and hosted it from 1986–1989.

West Coast Conference
Following the 1995 season, the program moved to the West Coast Conference (WCC), which the majority of the school's athletic programs had joined in the summer of 1979.  Also following the 1995 season, Pecarovich Field was renamed August/A.R.T. Stadium.

Gonzaga initially struggled in WCC baseball, finishing fifth, eighth, and sixth in its first three seasons.  However, after the WCC split into two four-team divisions prior to the 1999 season, Gonzaga finished second in its division in 1999 and 2000 and won the Coast Division in 2001.  In the best-of-three 2001 WCC Championship Series, Gonzaga lost to Pepperdine 2–1.

During the 2003 season, August/A.R.T. Stadium was razed to allow for the construction of the McCarthey Athletic Center.  The team used Spokane's Avista Stadium until its current venue, Washington Trust Field and Patterson Baseball Complex, was completed prior to the 2007 season.

Following the 2003 season, Steve Hertz retired after 24 seasons as the program's head coach, and was replaced by Mark Machtolf.  Under Machtolf, the team qualified for three WCC Championship Series (2007, 2009, 2011).  After losing to San Diego in 2007, Gonzaga defeated Loyola Marymount in 2009 to qualify for the program's first NCAA Tournament since 1981.  In the Fullerton Regional, the team defeated Georgia Southern in its first game, but it lost consecutive games to Cal State Fullerton and Utah and was eliminated.  In the 2011 WCC Championship Series, Gonzaga lost to San Francisco.

In 2016, as a sophomore future major leaguer Eli Morgan was 10–3 with a 3.73 ERA in 16 starts, earning him a spot on the All-West Coast Conference (WCC) First Team. His 10 wins tied him for second-most in the WCC, and his 3 shutouts led the conference. In 2017, his junior season, Morgan compiled a 10–2 record with a 2.86 ERA in 14 starts, during which he struck out a conference-leading 138 batters (second-most in school history) in 100.2 innings (12.3 strikeouts/9 innings), and was once again named to the All-WCC First Team. His 10 wins again tied him for second-most in the WCC, and he tied for the conference lead with two shutouts. He was one of four pitchers in the country with more than one 15-strikeout games.  He was also named Perfect Game/Rawlings First Team All-American, Collegiate Baseball Second Team All-American, three-time National Player of the Week, and five-time Rawlings WCC Pitcher of the Week.

Conference affiliations
Independent (?–1963)
 Big Sky Conference (1964–1974)
 Northern Pacific Conference (NorPac) (1975–1981)
 Pacific-10 Conference (1982–1995) affiliate member
 West Coast Conference (1996–present)

Venues

Early venues
The earliest known venue of the program is Underhill Park, located off-campus across the Spokane River.  Underhill still functions as a municipal park in Spokane.  The team moved from Underhill to its first on-campus home, located in Gonzaga's upper campus, where it played until after the 1966 season.

August/A.R.T. Stadium
From 1967 into the 2003 season, the program played at August/A.R.T. Stadium, which had a capacity of  The ballpark opened in 1967 as Pecarovich Field, named for former Gonzaga football player and coach Mike Pecarovich (1898–1965).  Gonzaga swept a doubleheader against Central Washington on April 7 to open the field.

Prior to the 1996 season, the venue was renamed August/A.R.T. Stadium, and Gonzaga used it into the 2003 season; it was demolished and the McCarthey Athletic Center was built on the site. In the stadium's last game on April 13, Gonzaga lost to San Francisco 8–3. The remainder of the home schedule in 2003 was played at Spokane Falls Community College.

Avista Stadium

For three seasons (2004–2006), Gonzaga played at Avista Stadium, the home venue of the minor league Spokane Indians. Opened in 1958 as a Triple-A ballpark, it has a capacity of 7,162 spectators.

Washington Trust Field and Patterson Baseball Complex

At the start of the 2007 season, the program opened its current venue, Washington Trust Field and Patterson Baseball Complex.  In the home opener on March 15, Gonzaga defeated Rider 9–4. It was dedicated a month later on April 20, named for Washington Trust Bank, a donor to the field's construction, and Michael Patterson, a Gonzaga alumnus.  It has a capacity of 1,500 spectators.

Head coaches
Steve Hertz is the winningest and longest-tenured head coach in Gonzaga athletics history; in 24 seasons (1978, 1981–2003) at the helm, he recorded 637 wins.

Yearly records
Below is a table of the program's yearly records.

Notable former players

Below is a list of notable former Bulldogs and the seasons in which they played for the program.

 Jason Bay (1998–1999)
 Rich Beck (1961–1962)
 T. R. Bryden (1980–1981)
 Leon Cadore (1906–1908)
 Mike Davey (1972–1974)
 Marco Gonzales (2011–2013)
 Tom Gorman (1977–1980)
 Bo Hart (1999–2000)
 Steve Hertz (1970–1972)
 Mel Ingram (1925–1928)
 Cody Martin (2008–2011)
 Eli Morgan (2015-2017), pitcher
 Clayton Mortensen (2006–2007)
 Casey Parsons (1973–1976)
 Mike Redmond (1990–1993)
 Kevin Richardson (2001–2002)
 Lenn Sakata (1973–1974)
 Dave Skeels (1910)
 Jack Spring (1951)
 Rick Sweet (1973–1975)
 Brandon Bailey (2014-2016)

Retired numbers
The first retired number for the program was number 19 in 1982, worn by walk-on third baseman Mac Gebbers (1978–1982).

2012 MLB Draft
Two Bulldogs were selected in the 2012 Major League Baseball Draft: OF Royce Bolinger by the Texas Rangers (6th round) and P Tyler Olson by the Oakland Athletics (17th round).  Bolinger signed a professional contract with the Rangers, while Olson chose not to sign with Oakland.

2017 MLB Draft
Pitcher Eli Morgan was selected by the Cleveland Indians in the eighth round of the 2017 Major League Baseball draft.  He signed with the Indians for a $135,000 signing bonus, and made his MLB debut in 2021.

2018 MLB Draft 
Two Bulldogs were selected in the 2018 Major League Baseball Draft: P Daniel Bies by the New York Yankees (7th round) and P Casey Legumina by the Cleveland Indians (35th round). Bies signed with the Yankees, Legumina is currently unsigned.

See also

 List of NCAA Division I baseball programs

References

External links